The Vicinic ( - Vičinik) is a left tributary of the river Karaš in Romania and Serbia. Its source and the greatest part of the river are located in Romania. There it flows through the villages Ilidia, Ciuchici, Nicolinț, Rusova Nouă, Rusova Veche, Berliște, Milcoveni, and Iam. On its lower reach it crosses the border into Serbia before joining the Karaš in Dobričevo.

References

Rivers of Serbia
Rivers of Romania
Rivers of Caraș-Severin County